The 7th European Film Awards were presented on 27 November 1994 in Berlin, Germany. The winners were selected by the members of the European Film Academy.

Awards

Best Film

Best Documentary

Lifetime Achievement Award

References

External links 
 European Film Academy Archive

1994 film awards
European Film Awards ceremonies
1994 in Germany
1994 in Europe